Alexander Piller (born 12 July 1993) is a German footballer who plays as a midfielder for SC Eltersdorf.

References

External links
 
 

1993 births
Sportspeople from Erlangen
Footballers from Bavaria
Living people
German footballers
Association football midfielders
SpVgg Greuther Fürth II players
SpVgg Unterhaching players
1. FC Schweinfurt 05 players
SpVgg Bayreuth players
SC Eltersdorf players
3. Liga players
Regionalliga players
Oberliga (football) players